Marshall Price Webb (February 9, 1862 – May 16, 1938) was an American Republican politician who represented the Virginia's 6th district in the state senate.

References

External links
 
 

1862 births
1938 deaths
Republican Party Virginia state senators
People from Carroll County, Virginia
20th-century American politicians